A post office is a public facility and a retailer  that provides mail services, such as accepting letters and parcels, providing post office boxes, and selling postage stamps, packaging, and stationery. Post offices may offer additional services, which vary by country. These include providing and accepting government forms (such as passport applications), and processing government services and fees (such as road tax, postal savings, or bank fees). The chief administrator of a post office is called a postmaster.

Before the advent of postal codes and the post office, postal systems would route items to a specific post office for receipt or delivery. During the 19th century in the United States, this often led to smaller communities being renamed after their post offices, particularly after the Post Office Department began to require that post office names not be duplicated within a state.

Name

The term "post-office" has been in use since the 1650s, shortly after the legalisation of private mail services in England in 1635. In early modern England, post riders—mounted couriers—were placed, or "posted", every few hours along post roads at posting houses (also known as post houses) between major cities, or "post towns". These stables or inns permitted important correspondence to travel without delay. In early America, post offices were also known as stations. This term, as well as the term "post house", fell from use as horse and coach services were replaced by railways, aircraft, and automobiles.

Today, the term "post office" usually refers to government postal facilities providing customer service. "General Post Office" is sometimes used for the national headquarters of a postal service, even if the building does not provide customer service. A postal facility that is used exclusively for processing mail is instead known as a sorting office or delivery office, which may have a large central area known as a sorting or postal hall. Integrated facilities combining mail processing with railway stations or airports are known as mail exchanges.

In India, post offices are found in almost every village having panchayat (a "village council"), towns, cities, and throughout the geographical area of India. India's postal system changed its name to India Post after the advent of private courier companies in the 1990s. It is run by the Indian government's Department of Posts. India Post accepts and delivers inland letters, postcards, parcels, postal stamps, and money orders (money transfers). Few post offices in India offer speed post (fast delivery) and payments or bank savings services. It is also uncommon for Indian post offices to sell insurance policies or accept payment for electricity, landline telephone, or gas bills. Until the 1990s, post offices would collect fees for radio licenses, recruitment for government jobs, and the operation of public call telephone (PCO) booths. Postmen would deliver letters, money orders, and parcels to places that are within the assigned area of a particular post office but there are no post offices in the location. Each Indian post office is assigned a unique six-digit code called the Postal Index Number, or PIN. Each post office is identified by its PIN.

Private courier and delivery services often have offices as well, although these are usually not called "post offices", except in the case of Germany, which has fully privatised its national postal system.

As abbreviation PO is used, together with GPO for General Post Office and LPO for Licensed Post Office.

History

There is evidence of corps of royal couriers disseminating the decrees of Egyptian pharaohs as early as 2400BCE, and it is possible that the service greatly precedes that date. Similarly, there may be ancient organised systems of post houses providing mounted courier service, although sources vary as to precisely who initiated the practice.

In the Persian Empire, a Chapar Khaneh system existed along the Royal Road. Similar postage systems were established in India and China by the Mauryan and Han dynasties in the 2nd century BCE.

The Roman historian Suetonius credited Augustus with regularising the Roman transportation and courier network, the Cursus Publicus. Local officials were obliged to provide couriers who would be responsible for their message's entire course. Locally maintained post houses privately owned rest houses and were obliged or honored to care for couriers along their way. The Roman emperor Diocletian later established two parallel systems: one providing fresh horses or mules for urgent correspondence and the other providing sturdy oxen for bulk shipments. The Byzantine historian Procopius, though not unbiased, records the Cursus Publicus system remained largely intact until it was dismantled in the Byzantine empire by the emperor Justinian in the 6th century.

The Princely House of Thurn and Taxis family initiated regular mail service from Brussels in the 16th century, directing the Imperial Post of the Holy Roman Empire. The British Postal Museum claims that the oldest functioning post office in the world is on High Street in Sanquhar, Scotland. The post office has functioned continuously since 1712, during which horses and stagecoaches were used to carry mail.

In parts of Europe, special postal censorship offices existed to intercept and censor mail. In France, such offices were known as cabinets noirs.

Unstaffed postal facilities

In many jurisdictions, mailboxes and post office boxes have long been in widespread use for drop-off and pickup (respectively) of mail and small packages outside post offices or when offices are closed. Germany's national postage system Deutsche Post introduced the Pack-Station for package delivery, including both drop-off and pickup, in 2001.  In the 2000s, the United States Postal Service began to install Automated Postal Centers (APCs) in many locations in both post offices, for when they are closed or busy, and retail locations.  APCs can print postage and accept mail and small packages.

Notable post offices

Operational
General Post Office, state postal system and telecommunications carrier of the United Kingdom until 1969
 General Post Office in Dublin (inaugurated 1818), headquarters of the Irish post and headquarters of the 1916 Easter Uprising
 General Post Office (1864), erected on the site of the Black Hole of Calcutta
 General Post Office (1874) in Chennai, India
 General Post Office (1887) in Lahore, Pakistan
 General Post Office (1895), the headquarters of the Sri Lankan Post
 General Post Office (1903), headquarters of the Croatian post
 General Post Office (1976), the headquarters of Hongkong Post
 General Post Office (1913), the main post office of Mumbai, India, and one of the world's largest (120,000 sq ft or 11,000 m2)
 General Post Office Building (1922), former headquarters of the Chunghwa Post and present home of the Shanghai Postal Museum
 Central Post Office (1939), also temporary home to the Privy Council of Canada
 Manila Central Post Office (1926, rebuilt after WWII)
 James Farley Post Office (1912), America's largest operating post office, the main office for New York City. Bears the famous translation of Herodotus's description of the Persian postal system along its front facade: "Neither snow nor rain nor heat nor gloom of night stays these couriers from the swift completion of their appointed rounds"
 The Edificio Central de Correos y Telégrafos building (1917), San José, Costa Rica. Contains the Costa Rican Philatelic Museum on the second floor
 Polish Post Office, a scene of intense fighting during the 1939 Nazi Germany invasion of Danzig
 Taipei Post Office (1928), the headquarters of Taiwan Post
 First Toronto Post Office (1833)
 Istanbul Main Post Office (1905), home of the Istanbul Postal Museum

Former
 Bandinelli Palace (1589), a former post office in Lviv in Ukraine
General Post Office (Washington, D.C.) (1842), the city's first "all-marble" building, patterned after Rome's Temple of Jupiter and now a 4-star hotel, Hotel Monaco
 Chief Post Office (1877), the former chief post office of New Zealand in Christchurch
 Central Post Office Building (1903), home of the Government of Sweden
 Buenos Aires Central Post Office (1908), now the Bicentennial Cultural Center
 The Fullerton (1919), a 5-star hotel in Singapore
 Old Main Post Office (1921), an enormous abandoned structure in Chicago
 Palazzo Delle Poste (1928), the former post office of Naples, Italy, heavily damaged during Naples' 1943 uprising against the Nazis

Historic
 The General Post Office East (1825), former headquarters of the GPO in London, demolished in 1912

See also

Postage stamp
Dak bungalows, the former posthouses of the British Raj
Freepost (also known as Business Reply Mail)
"Going postal"
Mail
Military mail
Old U.S. Post Offices
Penny Post
Post office box
Postal administration
Postal code, ZIP code
History of United States postage rates
Poste restante (also known as General Delivery)
Universal Postal Union
Wanted poster (Post Office Wall)

References

External links

 Photos of post offices around the world
 Royal Mail
 The British Postal Museum & Archive
 United Kingdom Post Office site
 United States Postal Service
 Universal Postal Union